Jämtland County held a county council election on 19 September 2010, on the same day as the general and municipal elections.

Results
The number of seats remained at 55 with the Social Democrats winning the most at 24, a gain of two from 2006. The party received near 41% of a valid vote of 78,700.

Municipalities

Images

References

Elections in Jämtland County
Jämtland